St Peter's School is a former school at 38 St Oswald's Place, Vauxhall, London SE11.

It was built in 1860–61, designed by John Loughborough Pearson, and is Grade II* listed.

References

External links
 

Grade II* listed buildings in the London Borough of Lambeth
J. L. Pearson buildings